Vladimir Vuksanović (born January 14, 1988) is a Serbian professional basketball coach and former player. He currently serves as an assistant coach for the Serbia women's national basketball team.

External links
 Vladimir Vuksanović at abaliga.com
 Vladimir Vuksanović at eurobasket.com
 Coach Profile at eurobasket.com

1978 births
Living people
ABA League players
BC Azovmash players
KK Beopetrol/Atlas Beograd players
BC Khimki players
KK FMP (1991–2011) players
KK Vizura players
KK Igokea players
BC Kalev/Cramo players
KK Mornar Bar players
KK Radnički Kragujevac (2009–2014) players
KK Srem players
Kolossos Rodou B.C. players
P.A.O.K. BC players
Power forwards (basketball)
Serbian expatriate basketball people in Bosnia and Herzegovina
Serbian expatriate basketball people in Estonia
Serbian expatriate basketball people in Greece
Serbian expatriate basketball people in Montenegro
Serbian expatriate basketball people in Russia
Serbian expatriate basketball people in Romania
Serbian expatriate basketball people in Japan
Serbian expatriate basketball people in Ukraine
Serbian men's basketball coaches
Serbian men's basketball players